The Slocan Valley Rail Trail is a multi-use recreational rail trail in the West Kootenay region of southeastern British Columbia.

Overview 
The trail uses the former Columbia and Kootenay Railway rail corridor along the section of the Slocan Valley between South Slocan and Slocan that the Canadian Pacific Railway (CP) abandoned in 1994. Subsequently, CP removed the rails and ties, and dismantled the bridges.

The  trail is owned by the government of BC and managed by the Slocan Valley Heritage Trail Society (SVHTS).

Timeline
1993: CP ran last freight train on September 14.
1994: The SVHTS was formed. CP applied to abandon line.
1999: CP gifted the right-of-way to the Trans Canada Trail (TCT).
2000: TCT gave the property to the BC government.
2002: SVHTS signed a 10-year agreement to manage rail trail.
2003: SICEA grant received.
2005 Construction of three new bridges, complete grading and brushing, extensive resurfacing and construction of trailheads.
2007: Trail opened.
2012: Became official TCT spur.
2017: South Slocan–Crescent Valley becomes paved greenway.

Sections

South Slocan box culvert
Five decades later, that bridge over the rail trail needed costly structural rehabilitation. Local artist Peter Vogelaar and volunteers painted a mural along the length of the tunnel detailing the valley history.

References

Rail trails in British Columbia